Barut Aghaji (also Romanized as Bārūt Āghājī; also known as Balūţ Āqājī, Baraalu, and Bārūţ Āqājī) is a village in Mojezat Rural District, in the Central District of Zanjan County, Zanjan Province, Iran. At the 2006 census, its population was 577, in 139 families.

References 

Populated places in Zanjan County